The Orpheum Theater is a theater located in Omaha, Nebraska. The theater hosts programs best served by a more theatrical setting, including the Omaha Performing Arts Broadway Season, presented with Broadway Across America, and Opera Omaha's season. The theatre is listed on the National Register of Historic Places. The main auditorium is a proscenium theater known as "Slosburg Hall". The theater has a theatre organ, made by Wurlitzer.

History

The current site of the building was previously home to the "Creighton Theater".  John A. McShane organized a stock company to build the original theater in 1895. The architects for the original theater were Fisher & Lawrie and the general contractors were Rocheford & Gould. Paxton and Vierling installed the iron curtain that weighed 11 tons. The theater was named after John A. Creighton, a local philanthropist, and a large portrait of Count Creighton decorated the proscenium arch.  The Creighton Theater was eventually added to the Orpheum Circuit, which by 1900 had expanded to nine western cities: Omaha, Chicago, Kansas City, New Orleans, Denver, Salt Lake City, Los Angeles, San Francisco and Sacramento. The reference to Creighton was eventually dropped from the theater's name.

By 1926 a new, larger theater was in the works. The current space was built in 1926 on the same site as the original Creighton Theater, but with its entrance situated on 16th Street. When vaudeville acts were no longer in fashion, a screen was added and the theater operated as a downtown movie theater from the 1940s through 1971. A year later, the Knights of Ak-Sar-Ben purchased the building and began a $2 million renovation and became a performing arts venue once again.

In 2002, Omaha Performing Arts Society assumed management of the Orpheum Theater from the City of Omaha, and the Orpheum underwent a $10 million renovation, making it capable of accommodating larger and more complicated scenery and sets. The Skylink was added in 2004 for increased convenience and accessibility to the theater. The 200-foot-long elevated, enclosed and climate-controlled walkway connects the OPPD parking garage to the venue.

In October 2013, the steel-letter marquee that was installed with the 1975 renovation was replaced with a digital electronic display board. The signage upgrades also included the installation of LED posters in the theater's lobby. During the summer of 2017, the theatre received a $3 million update, including paint, new carpeting and a refresh of seating.

See also 
 History of Omaha
 List of theaters in Omaha, Nebraska
 City National Bank Building (Omaha)
 Theatre in Omaha
 Culture in Omaha, Nebraska

External links 
History of the theater
Omaha Orpheum Interior
Postcard Orpheum Theater Interior
Original Omaha Orpheum Theater Postcard
Orpheum Circuit Program - Omaha Orpheum on lower left
Historic Images of the Orpheum - Nebraska Memories

References 

History of Downtown Omaha, Nebraska
Movie palaces
Theatres in Omaha, Nebraska
Theatres in Nebraska
Music venues in Omaha, Nebraska
Cinemas and movie theaters in Omaha, Nebraska
National Register of Historic Places in Omaha, Nebraska
Theatres on the National Register of Historic Places in Nebraska
Public venues with a theatre organ
Theatres completed in 1927
1927 establishments in Nebraska